= Mmog.asia =

MMOG asia is a gaming platform established by Malaysian game publishing company MyCNX Holding (M) Sdn Bhd which was incorporated in 2005. The company was acquired by MOL Global, Inc as subsidiary in November 2012, which is wholly owned by MOL and operates MMOG.asia.

== About MyCNX Holdings ==
MyCNX Holdings (MyCNX Holdings (M) Sdn Bhd) was incorporated in 2006 from CNX Solution. In second year, MyCNX captured decent market share in the Malaysia Online Gaming Industry (2006) mainly from the core game titled "Water Margin Online". The company granted MSC status company in Malaysia at 2007. It has a paid up capital of MYR 2 million and incorporated its Thailand subsidiary company in 2012.

== Achievements ==
2007

- PIKOM National ICT Awards - Emerging ICT Company of the Year 2007
- 3C Digital Ultimate IT Brand Award 2007
- Gaming Entertainment – Top 10 Online Games – Water Margin Online
- Gaming Entertainment – Top 10 Online Games – World of Kung Fu

2008

- GAMES Ultimate IT Brand Award - Digital Multimedia Gaming Entertainment
- Most Favorites Online Games (Top 5) – EA Sports FIFA Online 2

2009

- GameAxis - MALAYSIA SURVEY 2009
- Favorite Localized English Casual MMO Game – EA Sports FIFA Online 2

2010

- GameAxis - MALAYSIA SURVEY 2010 – People’s Choice Awards
- Favorite Localized English Casual MMO Game – War2
- Money Online (MOL) - Top 10 Online Game Publisher

2011

- 第七大道－2012 弹弹堂－卓越合作伙伴 Premier Partner

2012

- 第七大道－2012 弹弹堂－卓越合作伙伴 Premier Partner

2013

- MOL AccessPortal Berhad - Top 10 Online Game Publisher
- Golden Eagle Award 2013 - Excellent Eagle
- Golden Eagle Award 2013 - The Best in Service Sector
- Golden Eagle Award 2013 - 1st Position Winner of the Top 10 Excellent Eagle

The company published its first "Free to Play" MMORPG "Water Margin Online" in 2005 and quickly become very popular along Malaysian. Followed by 2008, they published the first web-based simulation game "Battle of the 3 Kingdoms" and followed with the most successful title "Boomz" as top and leading web-based game since 2010 in Malaysia too.

== Technology ==
The company uses VM technology for game servers and database management. With comprehensive software such as Oracle Database and VMware (server) that manages players registration, login, account information, virtual item shopping cart, and integrates payment fulfillment. Besides, backup facilities using SAN in combination with RAID.
